The San Buenaventura Conservancy for Preservation is an historic preservation organization in Ventura, California also known by its early name of San Buenaventura. It works to recognize and revitalize historic, archeological and cultural resources in the region. The Conservancy is a non-profit 501c3 organization. The group was formed in 2004 after the demolition of the Mayfair Theater, an S. Charles Lee, Streamline Moderne, movie theater in downtown Ventura, California that was razed and replaced with a condominium project.

Mission 

The San Buenaventura Conservancy mission statement: "To work through advocacy and outreach to recognize preserve and revitalize the irreplaceable historic, architectural and cultural resources of San Buenaventura and surrounding areas. To seek to increase public awareness of and participation in local preservation issues, and disseminate information useful in the preservation of structures and neighborhoods of San Buenaventura."  San Buenaventura Conservancy website

Programs & Projects 

The organization produces annual historic architecture tours in the historic neighborhoods and districts in midtown, downtown and the west side of  Ventura, California. The conservancy is an all-volunteer organization with a ten-member board. Some of the Conservancy's most successful projects outside of the Ventura architectural Weekend tours and trade shows has been the ability of the board to work closely the City of  Ventura, California and developers to find preservation solutions for historic buildings. At times the Conservancy advocates for specific historic buildings like Willett Ranch link to article and the Top Hat Burger Palace in Ventura, the Frank Petit House in South Oxnard, California, the Charles McCoy house, in Port Hueneme, California, and the Bracero farm Worker Camp in Piru, California, and the Wagon Wheel Motel on the 101 Freeway in Oxnard, California. Additionally the Conservancy works to strengthen preservation policies of local municipalities. It has achieved success at integrating appropriate preservation actions and policies into Ventura's General Plan, Downtown Specific Plan, and Westside Community Plan.

On March 2, 2009 the San Buenaventura Conservancy – with attorney Susan Brandt-Hawley – filed suit in Ventura County Superior Court against the City of Oxnard, California, claiming that the City’s approval of the Oxnard Village Specific Plan project violated the California Environmental Quality Act (CEQA). link to article The project, as approved, requires the demolition of the Wagon Wheel Motel and restaurant, El Ranchito and bowling alley along with everything built on the  site. The Conservancy case argues that the project can be feasibly accomplished without demolition of the Wagon Wheel, and CEQA therefore does not allow the Class 1 impact. The lawsuit requests issuance of a peremptory writ ordering the City to set aside its approval of the project pending compliance with CEQA.

The original Ventura County Superior Court case was presented July 10, 2009. The Judge sided with the city of Oxnard. The San Buenaventura Conservancy has appealed the ruling and received a stay of demolition until the outcome of the appeal case: San Buenaventura Conservancy v. City of Oxnard et al. (CEQA) (Case: B220512 2nd District, Division 6.) link to article  On Wednesday December 15, a three judge panel at the California 2nd district Court of Appeal in Ventura, California heard arguments from attorneys representing the case: Susan Brandt-Hawley for the San Buenaventura Conservancy, and Rachel Cook representing the developer ( Oxnard Village Investments, LLC.) and the city of Oxnard, California. The Appeals Court sided with the City of Oxnard on March 17, 2011 and agreed with the Superior court that the CEQA review was sufficient. The Wagon Wheel was demolished a week later.

References

Shepherd, Dirk, Save the Wagon Wheel, VC Reporter Newspaper article, Jan 11, 2007, link to article

Levin, Charles, Ventura County Star Newspaper, Old motel might be declared landmark, January 23, 2007, link to article

Singer, Matthew, Looking for a landmark, VC Reporter Newspaper article, January 25, 2007, link to article

Clerici, Kevin Group sues Ventura to halt razing of ranch, Ventura County Star Newspaper article, June 28, 2007, link to article

Lascher, Bill, VC Reporter Newspaper article, Hotel could occupy Chumash Village site, February 7, 2008, link to article

Clerici, Kevin Historical Willett buildings to remain on site, Ventura County Star Newspaper article, February 27, 2008, link to article

Lascher, Bill, Endangered Heritage and San Buenaventura Conservancy's 11 most endangered list, VC Reporter Newspaper article, June 12, 2008, link to article

Cason, Coleen, Ventura County Star Newspaper article, Changing days, landmarks in photo calendar, December 28, 2008, link to article

VC Reporter Newspaper article, The San Buenaventura Conservancy hosts an architectural, archaeological tour, January 15, 2009, link to article

Hadley, Scott, Ventura County Star Newspaper, Oxnard Wagon Wheel Development to be taken up by council, January 27, 2009, 

Hadley, Scott, Ventura County Star Newspaper, Wagon Wheel redevelopment approved, January 29, 2009,

Sullivan, Michael, VC Reporter Newspaper article, Historical homes in Oxnard meet a fiery grave this week, February 26, 2009, link to article

Foster, Margaret, Lawsuit Stalls Loss of 1947 Motel, Preservation Magazine (Online), March 26, 2009, link to article

Foster, Margaret, Calif. City Burns Down 1883 Farmhouses, Preservation Magazine (Online), March 31, 2009

Ventura County Star Newspaper, Memorial Boulder Keeps on Rollin''', March 29, 2009, link to article

Chawkins Steve, Trying to keep Oxnard's Wagon Wheel in place, Los Angeles Times, April 10, 2009, link to article

Hadley, Scott, Ventura County Star Newspaper, Judge Blocks Demolition of Wagon Wheel Buildings, October 31, 2009,

Sisolak, Paul, Wagon Wheel Headed Back To Court, VC Reporter Newspaper article, November 12, 2009, 

Hadley, Scott, Ventura County Star Newspaper, Judge Clears way for Wagon Wheel Demolition, November 17, 2009,

Sisolak, Paul, Court Appeal Possible in Wagon Wheel Preservation Case, VC Reporter Newspaper article, November 19, 2009,

McKinnon, Lisa, Ventura County Star Newspaper, Ventura's Top Hat Burger Palace given 30 days to vacate site, January 8, 2010, link to article

Cohn, Shane, VC Reporter Newspaper article, Up for debate The future of Ventura’s Westside may rest in Rancho Cañada Larga, December 9, 2010, link to article

Hadley, Scott, Ventura County Star Newspaper, Final arguments presented in Wagon Wheel case'', December 15, 2010, link to article

External links
 National Trust for Historic Preservation
 Wagon Wheel Photos on Flickr
 San Buenaventura Conservancy website

Historic preservation organizations in the United States
Heritage organizations
Architectural history
Urban planning in California